Jack Keller (December 29, 1942 – December 5, 2003) was a professional poker player.  He was inducted into the Poker Hall of Fame in 1994.

Keller won the 1984 World Series of Poker Main Event, three WSOP bracelets, and more than $1,580,000 in tournament play at the World Series of Poker during his career.  He also won two Super Bowl of Poker Main Events when the SBOP was considered the second most prestigious tournament in the world.

Keller served in the United States Air Force prior to becoming a professional poker player. He had three children, including former poker professional Kathy Kolberg.  He died in Tunica, Mississippi on December 5, 2003.

Keller's total lifetime tournament winnings were $3,900,424. His 26 cashes at the WSOP accounted for $1,610,940 of his lifetime winnings.

World Series of Poker Bracelets

Notes

1942 births
2003 deaths
American poker players
World Series of Poker Main Event winners
World Series of Poker bracelet winners
Super Bowl of Poker event winners
United States Air Force airmen
People from Tunica County, Mississippi
Poker Hall of Fame inductees